Smithsonia is an unincorporated community in Bibb County, in the U.S. state of Georgia.

History
Smithsonia received its name in 1926 in honor of Bridges Smith, a local judge.

References

Unincorporated communities in Georgia (U.S. state)
Unincorporated communities in Bibb County, Georgia